Murphy Radio was a British manufacturer of radios and televisions based in Welwyn Garden City, England.

Murphy Radio was founded in 1929 by Frank Murphy and E.J. Power as a volume manufacturer of home radio sets. Its factories were in the Hertfordshire town of Welwyn Garden City, England, starting with fewer than 100 employees. Murphy also had a manufacturing facility in Islandbridge, Dublin, Ireland.

The company played an important role during World War II, designing and manufacturing radio sets for British Armed Forces use, chiefly the Wireless Set No. 38. After the war, Murphy used its military experience to design and build sets for Naval use, principally the 'B40' series for the British Commonwealth Navies. The company also produced the Larkspur era A41 VHF manpack transceiver for the British Army during the 1950s.

Murphy himself left the company during 1937 and went on to found another company called, perhaps unwisely, 'FM Radio'. He died aged 65, in 1955.
 
Although the company became well known for the manufacture of television sets, it was eventually amalgamated with Bush Radio in 1962. The brand 'Murphy' has survived, but as a licensee for Far Eastern electronics.

In 2012, the brand gained wide attention in India due to the movie Barfi!. A vintage Murphy radio also appears in the opening of the 2012 film Life of Pi.

References

External links
Murphy Radio – Dave Grant

History of radio
Electronics companies of the United Kingdom
Defunct manufacturing companies of the United Kingdom
Companies based in Welwyn Hatfield
Electronics companies established in 1929
Electronics companies disestablished in 1962
1929 establishments in England
1962 disestablishments in England
Radio manufacturers